Seán Moore (19 May 1913 – 1 October 1986) was an Irish Fianna Fáil politician.

Moore was born in Dublin in 1913 and grew up in Irishtown, Dublin. He was educated at the Vocational School in Ringsend and University College Dublin where he received a diploma in Social and Economic Science. He worked as an official with the Alliance and Dublin Consumers' Gas Company before becoming involved in politics. Moore first became involved in politics in 1950 when he was elected to Dublin City Council, a position he would hold until 1979. He served as Lord Mayor of Dublin from 1963 to 1964. Moore was elected to Dáil Éireann as a Fianna Fáil Teachta Dála (TD) on his third attempt at the 1965 general election, representing the Dublin South-East constituency in the 18th Dáil.

In 1979 Charles Haughey came to power and Moore became Government Chief Whip. His health declined during this period, so much so that the Assistant Chief Whip, Bertie Ahern, was doing most of Moore's work. He served in that position until Fianna Fáil lost power at the 1981 general election and remained in the Dáil until he lost his seat at the February 1982 general election. He fought one further general election in November 1982 but failed to be elected, and subsequently retired from politics.

Seán Moore Road and Seán Moore Park near Irishtown are named after him.

References

 

1913 births
1986 deaths
Fianna Fáil TDs
Lord Mayors of Dublin
Members of the 18th Dáil
Members of the 19th Dáil
Members of the 20th Dáil
Members of the 21st Dáil
Members of the 22nd Dáil
Politicians from County Dublin
Alumni of University College Dublin
Ministers of State of the 21st Dáil
Government Chief Whip (Ireland)